Warsaw Chopin Airport  is an international airport in the Włochy district of Warsaw, Poland. It is Poland's busiest airport with 18.9 million passengers in 2019, thus handling approximately 40% of the country's total air passenger traffic. The airport is a central hub for LOT Polish Airlines as well as a base for Enter Air and Wizz Air.

London, Kyiv, Frankfurt, Paris, and Amsterdam are the busiest international connections, while Kraków, Wrocław, and Gdańsk are the most popular domestic ones.

Founded in 1934, the airport was previously known as Warsaw-Okęcie Airport and bore the name of its Okęcie neighborhood throughout its history. It was renamed in honour of Polish composer and former Warsaw resident Frédéric Chopin in 2001. Despite the official change, "Okecie" remains in popular and industry use, including air traffic and aerodrome references.

An underground railway station connected from the airport to Warsaw's suburban rail system was opened in June 2012 in time for the Euro 2012 football championships, and on 25 November 2013, the airport announced accommodating – for the first time in history – its 10 millionth passenger in a single year. A new and modern terminal was completed in 2015.

The secondary international airport of the city is the much smaller Warsaw Modlin Airport, which opened in 2012 and is used for low-cost traffic.

History

The pre-war and wartime Okęcie (1934–45)
In 1924, when urban development around Warsaw's aerodrome at Mokotów Field (Pole Mokotowskie) began affecting air traffic, the Ministry of Railways purchased land near the village of Okęcie to construct a new airport. On 29 April 1934, the Polish president, Ignacy Mościcki, opened Central Airport (Okęcie), which from then on took over the handling of all traffic from the former civilian aerodrome at Pole Mokotowskie.  In the weeks after its opening, a journalist from the magazine Flight and Air Defence of Poland reported the following: "In a large pastel-coloured hall, we see a ticket office, a customs post, telegraph and post office, police station and a kiosk with various newspapers etc... On the first (upper) floor, there is a restaurant and viewing terrace, from where one can see the entire territory of the airport." 

With the building finished in 1933, the new modernist premises of the Warsaw airport cost the State Treasury around zl 10 million. The new complex included three hangars, exhibition space, garages, and of course a large, modern terminal building with a concrete taxiway complete with stands for a number of aircraft. Warsaw thus received an airport befitting of any European capital city. In its first year of operation, Okęcie served around 10,750 passengers.  After the aerodrome's civilian buildings were finished, the military potential of the site began to be developed, with a Polish Air Force base opening soon after; later followed the buildings of the Institute of Aviation, PZL aircraft-building plant and other pieces of aviation infrastructure. 

As air traffic and the number of aircraft movements grew greatly year on year, the authorities identified the need to develop a new system for air traffic navigation and control. The state, as a result, marked a number of air corridors for use by civil airlines, whilst radio stations were established to regulate such traffic and divert it away from sensitive and restricted areas. By 1938, the airport was equipped with 16 immigration checkpoints for passengers both departing and arriving on international flights. These posts were then manned by the Polish Border Guard. By 1937, the airport had also received new radio navigation equipment and was using Lorenz beam technology to assure the safety of landings and approaches over Warsaw, during periods of poor visibility or bad weather. On the eve of World War II, Okęcie airport was connected by regular scheduled flights with 6 domestic and 17 foreign airports, among which were Tel-Aviv (then in Palestine) and Beirut in Lebanon; there were also plans to soon begin transatlantic service to the United States.

During World War II, Okęcie was often used as a battleground between the German Army and Polish resistance and was almost completely destroyed. From the very first day of the war in Poland, Okęcie became a target for bombing by the German Luftwaffe. Later, once Warsaw was occupied by the German army, the airport became the base for two German aviation schools and a Junkers aircraft repair works. During this period, the airport also received its first concrete runway and taxiways; these were left undamaged until the very final days of the war, despite numerous attacks by both the Home Army and Soviet Armed Forces. However, with the German withdrawal from the city, both Okęcie's remaining buildings and ground infrastructure (including the runway) were intentionally destroyed in order to deny their use to the advancing Red Army and Polish First Army.

Rebuilding Okęcie in the years 1945–89

After the war, LOT Polish Airlines resumed operations at Okęcie using what was left of the pre-war infrastructure; the airline was also responsible for initiating reconstruction efforts at the airport, and soon, within two years, a new terminal, control tower and a number of stands for aircraft based at and visiting the new Okęcie had been completed.

By the end of the 1940s, the airport had been reconnected with most of Poland's most important cities and a number of international services, including those to Moscow, Belgrade, Berlin, Bucharest, Budapest, Brussels, Copenhagen, Prague and Stockholm. In the first half of the 1950s, this development continued and the airport authorities continued to hold talks with many international airlines on the subject of opening routes to Warsaw. In 1956, maintenance of Okęcie was transferred from LOT Polish Airlines to state administration, then later in 1959, on the government's initiative, a decision was made to reconstruct the airport's main terminal; this, however, did not actually take place until 1964.

The new civil aviation authority began to exercise control over airports, air corridors and routing, ground aviation infrastructure and the responsibility for entering into and signing aviation accords with other states. This gave the authority effectively complete control over Warsaw's airport.

In 1961, the airport's management board decided to purchase a radar for civilian air traffic control and to begin the expansion of the airport in Warsaw. The winning design for a new terminal by Jan and Krystyna Dobrowolski referred to modern architectural solutions used in many western airports. In planning, it was ordered that the initial capacity of the new 'International Airport Station' (Międznarodowy Dworzec Lotniczy) should be about 1 million passengers a year.  In 1962, work began on the technical design of the new terminal, and two years later, construction started. At the same time on the opposite side of the airport, a new Air Traffic Control Centre (CKRL) was established along with the airport control tower. At this time, new radar, navigational and lighting systems for operations were also purchased. Runways 1 and 3 were also thoroughly renovated. 

In 1969, the new terminal officially became operational, with it celebrating, just one year later, its first million passengers served. However, it soon became apparent that the new terminal was too small. As a result of this situation, and to alleviate the problems it was causing, part of the airport's administrative office was moved to the south of the terminal and into makeshift buildings and the old airport premises on Ul. 17 Stycznia. A new separate, temporary arrival hall was then built. Meanwhile, domestic flights continued to operate from the facilities built on the site of the pre-war terminal. Some years later, in 1979, a new arrivals hall, the so-called 'Finnish Hall' opened. Thereafter, there was a further upgrade to the airport's runways, and after the renovation of runways 1 and 3, runway 2 was re-designated as taxiway 'Delta'; this was because of its location on the same axis as a number of major obstacles, most notably the Palace of Culture and Science and Raszyn radio transmitter.

Political events of the early 1980s caused a decline in passenger traffic, but already by 1983, there was renewed growth, especially on international routes. However, it turned out that the existing airport infrastructure was not able to handle as much traffic as the airport was dealing with by this period; thus, in November 1986, the Government decided to expand the airport. In the face of economic reform in the late 1980s, there was also a need to create a new managing body for airports and air traffic in Poland. In October 1987, a new company, the State Enterprise "Polish Airports" (PPL), an independent, self-governing and self-financing entity of the national economy, replaced the state aviation administration as the manager of the airport. The company was managed under the authority of the minister responsible for communications and transport was responsible.

Post-communist development (since 1989)

It was only in 1990, after the fall of communism, that a new terminal started to be built at Okęcie. The main contractor was the German company Hochtief, and the work involved some 164 subcontractors, of which 121 were Polish companies. After 24 months, the new terminal was completed at the expense of some 300 million German marks. A network of multi-storey car parks and access roads was also built, and with their completion, Warsaw gained a modern terminal with a capacity of 3.5 million passengers a year. The terminal began to operate on 1 July 1992, with the first travellers to use it being those returning from Athens, Bangkok, Dubai and New York. Ten days later, the airport celebrated the first passengers departing from the new Warsaw Okęcie. In the departure hall at that time, there were 26 check-in desks; however, in subsequent years of operation, passenger traffic grew rapidly. In 1993, the airport handled nearly 2.2 million passengers, while six years later, this figure climbed to 4 million. Eventually, the decision was taken to increase the number of available check-in desks to 33, and then to 46, consequently increasing the terminal's capacity to 6 million passengers a year.

In March 2001, Warsaw Airport was renamed in honour of the renowned Polish pianist and composer Frédéric Chopin (though this name is almost never used by residents of Warsaw, and most frequent visitors know the airport simply as Okęcie). A year later, a tender for the construction of a new passenger terminal at Warsaw airport was announced, this was then won by the Polish-Spanish consortium of Ferrovial Agromán, Budimex and Estudio Lamela, who joined in 2004 to implement the largest Polish investment in civil aviation history, Chopin Airport's long-awaited 'Terminal 2'. By 2006, the arrivals level of this new terminal had been inaugurated, with the departures level finally, after a long delay due to certification issues, being opened in late 2007. In this same year, the low-cost Etiuda terminal was also opened; this, however, was closed again just two years later in 2009, with all operations being transferred to terminals 1 and 2. The final and most recent developments in the airport's history came in the period covering 2010–2011, when the airport's new central and south piers were finished (left unfinished until the possibility of connecting them with the north pier appeared) and opened along with a redesigned terminal complex which saw the airport's two terminals merged to form a single 'Terminal A' complex. Despite this, work continues on reconstructing taxiways, ramps and access roads, the most important projects of which will see the airport connected to Poland's expressway network via the S79 Airport Expressway and S2 Southern Warsaw Bypass. An underground railway station connected to Warsaw's suburban rail system was opened in June 2012 in time for the UEFA Euro 2012 football championships.

As of July 2015, the airport is managed by the State Enterprise "Polish Airports" (PPL), which has existed since 1987 and deals with construction and operation of airports and provision of services to passengers and airlines. PPL is owned and managed by the Ministry of Infrastructure and Development, in line with the 1987 Act.

Runways
The airport has two intersecting runways, whose configuration and available taxiways under current rules permit 34 passenger operations (takeoffs or landings) per hour.

Terminals

Overview
In 2010, the designation of terminals had changed and the entire former Terminal 1 and Terminal 2 complex is now designated as Terminal A divided into five check-in areas (A, B, C, D, E) in two main halls. The complex contains 116 check-in desks. Additionally LOT Polish Airlines, Lufthansa, Finnair, Turkish Airlines, KLM and Air France passengers can use one of the 23 self-service check-in stands located in the Terminal. There are 45 passenger gates, 27 of which are equipped with jetways.

South hall
The south hall contains the check-in areas A and B (former Terminal 1) was built in 1992 with a capacity for 3.5 million passengers per year to replace the ageing complex from the Communist era. Initially, it handled all the traffic. Since 2007, the T2, a newly built terminal adjacent to T1, has been gradually taking over the major part of the traffic. Reconstruction of the south hall started on 13 September 2012. On 23 May 2015, the redesigned, reconstructed south hall was fully integrated into the 'Terminal A' complex. Before its refurbishment, the south hall was very recognisable by Poles for its very characteristically dark red colour of many construction elements, including the roof that covered the departure hall, pillars, frames of doors and windows and other. In Polish, it was called "buraczkowy", which simply means "beetroot-coloured" in English.

North hall
This new terminal (formerly known as Terminal 2), featuring the check-in areas C, D and E, became fully operational on 12 March 2008, two years after the originally planned opening date. The arrivals area was in operation from mid-2007 but problems with safety certification and disagreements between the airport and the construction firm delayed full operation. The new terminal is considerably larger than the older Terminal 1 and has taken over departures for all Star Alliance and Oneworld airlines and a few other carriers. August 2014 saw Chopin Airport as one of the first European airports offering free unlimited Internet access to all its passengers and visitors.

Airlines and destinations
The following airlines operate regular scheduled and charter flights to and from Warsaw–Chopin:

Statistics

Annual traffic

Routes

Aviation services 

Passenger handling, aircraft handling, into-plane fueling and de-icing/anti-icing services are handled by LS Airport Services (LS) or Welcome Airport Services (WAS).

Ground transportation
The airport is easy to access by train, local buses or taxi.

Rail

A rail link was built at a cost of 230 million złoty to connect the airport's Warsaw Chopin Airport railway station (built as part of the former Terminal 2) to the Warsaw city center. The station was opened on 1 June 2012, with service starting on the same day. Trains run every 15 minutes. Service to the station is provided by both Szybka Kolej Miejska and Masovian Railways. 

On 15 December 2019, a direct rail service was established with the city of Łodź.

Car
Żwirki i Wigury, named after the celebrated aviators who won the Challenge International de Tourisme in 1932, is the main artery leading to the airport.

Bus
Warsaw city centre can be reached by the bus lines: 175 and 188 during the day and N32 at night. There is also an additional line 148 that provides access to Ursynów (a southern part of Warsaw) and Praga (an eastern part of Warsaw). Bus 331 connects with the Wilanowska metro station.

Accidents and incidents
On 19 December 1962, a LOT Polish Airlines Vickers Viscount 804 crashed on approach after a flight from Brussels and Berlin-Schönefeld Airport, while attempting a go-around. All 33 passengers on board died.
On 14 March 1980, LOT Polish Airlines Flight 007, Ilyushin Il-62 aircraft crashed on final approach from New York City's John F. Kennedy International Airport, when attempting a go-around. All 87 passengers and crew members on board died, including the entire amateur US boxing team, Polish pop singer Anna Jantar and Alan P. Merriam.
On 9 May 1987, LOT Polish Airlines Flight 5055, Ilyushin Il-62M took off for a flight to New York city's John F. Kennedy International Airport and returned to Okęcie, after an engine failure. During its approach, the aircraft crashed in a heavily wooded area, short of the runway. All 183 passengers and crew members on board died.
On 14 September 1993 Lufthansa Flight 2904, Airbus A320-200 overran the runway 11. It was a flight from Frankfurt, Germany. The aircraft departed the runway and rolled  before it hit the embankment and an LLZ aerial. A fire started and penetrated into the passenger cabin. Two of 70 occupants died in this accident, including the training captain who died on impact and one passenger who was unable to escape because he lost consciousness as a result of the smoke in the cabin.
On 31 December 1993, LOT Polish Airlines Flight 002, a Boeing 767-300ER arriving from Chicago-O'Hare International Airport, suffered substantial damage after its nose gear collapsed when touching down. There were no fatalities.
On 1 November 2011, LOT Polish Airlines Flight 16, a Boeing 767-300ER, inbound from Newark Liberty International Airport, safely landed at Warsaw Chopin after a mechanical failure of the landing gear prior to landing. The cockpit crew successfully performed an emergency gear-up landing at the airport with no loss of life or injuries.

See also
 List of airports in Poland

References

External links

1934 establishments in Poland
Airports established in 1934
Airports in Poland
Buildings and structures in Warsaw
Airport